LY6/PLAUR domain containing 8 is a protein that in humans is encoded by the LYPD8 gene.

References

Further reading